Fairville is an unincorporated community in Fairfield Township, Palo Alto County, Iowa, United States.

History
Fairville's population was 54 in 1925.

References

Unincorporated communities in Palo Alto County, Iowa
Unincorporated communities in Iowa